Diplolaemus darwinii, also commonly known as Darwin's iguana and the southern Patagonian lizard, is a species of lizard in the family Leiosauridae. The species is native to the southern tip of South America.

Etymology
Both the specific name, darwinii, and the common name, Darwin's iguana, are in honor of Charles Darwin, who was an English naturalist and the author of On the Origin of Species.

Geographic range
D. darwinii is found in the Patagonian Desert in southern Argentina and Chile.

Description
Darwin's iguana has a broad, triangular head and strong jaws.

Diet
The diet of D. darwinii mostly consists of insects and other small invertebrates.

Habitat

Reproduction
D. darwinii is oviparous.

Conservation status
The IUCN has listed Darwin's iguana as being of "Least Concern" because of its wide range and the lack of any identified threats to the species.

References

Further reading
 Bell T (1843). In: Darwin C (1843). The Zoology of the Voyage of the H.M.S. Beagle, Under the Command of Captain Fitzroy, R.N., During the Years 1832 to 1836. Part V. Reptiles. London: Smith, Elder and Company. vi + 50 pp. + Plates 1-20. ("Diplolæmus darwinii ", new species, p. 20 + Plate 10).

Diplolaemus
Lizards of South America
Reptiles of Argentina
Reptiles of Chile
Fauna of Patagonia
Reptiles described in 1843
Taxa named by Thomas Bell (zoologist)